The 2004–05 Belgian Hockey League season was the 85th season of the Belgian Hockey League, the top level of ice hockey in Belgium. Four teams participated in the league, and the Chiefs Leuven won the championship.

Regular season

Playoffs

References
Season on hockeyarchives.info

Belgian Hockey League
Belgian Hockey League seasons
Bel